The 2019 Liège–Bastogne–Liège was a road cycling one-day race that took place on 28 April 2019 in Belgium. It was the 105th edition of Liège–Bastogne–Liège and the 20th event of the 2019 UCI World Tour. It was won by Jakob Fuglsang.

Teams
As Liège–Bastogne–Liège was a UCI World Tour event, all eighteen UCI WorldTeams were invited automatically and obliged to enter a team in the race. Seven UCI Professional Continental teams competed, completing the 25-team peloton.

Result

References

Liege-Bastogne-Liege
Liege-Bastogne-Liege
Liege-Bastogne-Liege
Liège–Bastogne–Liège